WBC Akademik Sofia is a Bulgarian women's basketball club from Sofia.

Titles
Bulgarian Leagues (8): 1960, 1966, 1968, 1969, 1970, 1975, 1976, 1982
Bulgarian Cups (5): 1957, 1960, 1967, 1973, 1975

External links
 Scheda su BulgarianBasketball.com

Akademik Sofia
Sport in Sofia
Basketball teams established in 1952